The Old Collier County Courthouse is a historic two-story concrete and stucco  courthouse building located in Everglades City, Florida. Designed in the Classical Revival style, it was built in 1926 by Barron Collier, who developed  Collier County and for whom the county was named. In 1962, the county seat was moved to East Naples and a new courthouse complex was built there. The building later served as the Everglades City Hall.

In 1989, the Old Collier County Courthouse was listed in "A Guide to Florida's Historic Architecture," published by the University Press of Florida. The courthouse was listed on the National Register of Historic Places on December 3, 2013.

References

External links

 Florida's Historic Courthouses

Buildings and structures in Collier County, Florida
Collier
Courthouses on the National Register of Historic Places in Florida
National Register of Historic Places in Collier County, Florida
Everglades City, Florida
Government buildings completed in 1926
1926 establishments in Florida